"In America" is a song written and performed by the Charlie Daniels Band. It was released in May 1980 as the lead single from their album Full Moon. A live music video was released in 2001 shortly after the September 11 attacks.

Content
The song was a reaction to the varying difficult issues facing America in the late 1970s – the fallout from the Watergate scandal, the simultaneous double-digit inflation, unemployment, and prime interest rates (leading to the misery index), and the 1979–1981 Iran Hostage Crisis.

Notwithstanding all the problems America was facing, the song described a patriotic, united America which would overcome the obstacles and return to its greatness ("we'll all stick together and you can take that to the bank / That's the cowboys and the hippies and the rebels and the yanks"). At one point, it quotes the title of Bobby Bare's "God Bless America Again," a song that asks for God's blessing over a struggling United States.

The song experienced a revival following the September 11 attacks, when it was floated around the Internet as "F*** Bin Laden."

Background and writing
The line, "Just go and lay your hand on a Pittsburgh Steelers fan" stems from Daniels' feeling that the people in Pittsburgh are "The salt of the earth, the finest, just the greatest people. The strength of America." He says, "I've gone to ball games at different places, but I've always felt the Pittsburgh Steelers fans, especially in the old stadium - I mean, they're steel workers and they're good old guys with blisters, or calluses on their hands. The strength of America is not in Washington, D.C., It's in our people, it's on the farms, in the factories. It's the people out here that make this country work. The truck drivers, the farmers. And these people, that's what they were, and I just felt like if you want to go to war, let me take some of these guys with me. Go lay your hand on a Pittsburgh Steelers fan, and you're gonna find out what American anger is, because it's the kind of people they are."

Chart performance

References

External links
 

1980 singles
Charlie Daniels songs
Songs written by Charlie Daniels
Epic Records singles
American patriotic songs
Song recordings produced by John Boylan (record producer)
1980 songs